Bara is a given name and a surname. As a masculine Arabic name, Baraبراء) means "innocence".

Given name
Bara Mamadou Ndiaye (born 1991), Senegalese football player in Turkey
Bára Nesvadbová (born 1975), Czech writer and journalist

Surname
 Ali Hadi Bara (1906–1971), Turkish sculptor
 Céline Bara (born 1978), French pornographic film actress
 Edgar Bara (1876–1962), French mandolin player, author and composer
 Guy Bara (1923–2003), Belgian comic artist
 Irina Maria Bara (born 1995), Romanian tennis player
 Johan Bara (1581–1634), Dutch painter, designer and engraver
 John Bara (born 1926), American politician
 Joseph Bara (1779–1793), French drummer boy mythologised by the French First Republic
 Jules Bara (1835–1900), Belgian liberal politician
 Margit Bara (1928–2016), Hungarian film actress
 Nina Bara (-1990), American film actress
 Theda Bara (1885–1955), American silent film actress
 Tina Bara (born 1962), German photographer

See also
Al-Bara ibn Azib (died 640), a companion of the Islamic prophet Muhammad
Al-Bara' ibn `Azib (died 690), a companion of the Islamic prophet Muhammad

Arabic masculine given names